OFC Gigant is a Bulgarian association football club based in Saedinenie, Plovdiv Province, currently playing in the South-East Third League, the third level of Bulgarian football.

History
The club was founded in 1946 and spent most of their early years in the country's lower divisions. In 2007 they finished in 1st place in the "A" RFG Plovdiv and once again returned the South East "V" group, where they have remained since.

Current squad

League positions

References

External links 
 Club profile at bgclubs.eu
  

Gigant